Pummarò is a 1990 Italian drama film directed by Michele Placido. It was screened in the Un Certain Regard section at the 1990 Cannes Film Festival.

Cast
 Thywill Abraham
 Kwaku Amenya
 Salvatore Billa
 Ottaviano Dell'Acqua
 Nicola Di Pinto
 Franco Interlenghi
 Gerardo Scala
 Pamela Villoresi
 Hermann Weisskopf
 Jacqueline Williams

See also
 Films about immigration to Italy

References

External links

1990 films
Italian drama films
1990s Italian-language films
1990 drama films
Films directed by Michele Placido
Films about immigration
1990s Italian films